Christopher Livingstone Eubank Jr (born 18 September 1989) is a British professional boxer. He has held multiple championships in two weight classes, including the WBA interim middleweight title twice between 2015 and 2021; the IBO super-middleweight title twice between 2017 and 2019; and the British middleweight title in 2016. He is the son of former two-division world champion of boxing, Chris Eubank.

As of February 2022, he is ranked as the world's fourth best active middleweight by BoxRec, seventh by the Transnational Boxing Rankings Board, and eighth by The Ring magazine.

Early life
Eubank was born in Hove, East Sussex, the son of Chris Eubank and Karron Suzanne Stephen-Martin. He was a pupil at Brighton College, Shoreham College for one year, and Spring Valley High School in Las Vegas for two years. Eubank featured alongside his father in the reality TV series At Home with the Eubanks.

At the age of 16, Eubank and his brother Sebastian (deceased 2021) moved to the United States to live with a guardian named Irene Hutton. It was explained by their mother Karron, as a paper adoption, as a means of gaining the two brothers dual citizenship without the need to marry, and to enhance their prospects of sporting careers.

Amateur career
Eubank started his amateur career in 2007. With the winning of his sixth amateur fight, he became the Amateur Golden Gloves Champion for the State of Nevada in his weight division of 165 lbs. With his eighth amateur fight he became the Amateur Golden Glove Champion for the Western States of the United States in his weight division. Eubank was 1–1 in the 2008 National Golden Gloves. He ended his amateur career with a record of 24–2.

Professional career

Early career
Eubank turned professional in 2011 and signed with promoter Mick Hennessy. He was mentored by his father, and trainer Ronnie Davies who also guided his father. Over the next three years, Eubank  amassed a record of 18–0 with 13 knockouts to his name.

Middleweight
On 19 February 2014, Eubank signed a deal to appear on BoxNation, with his first fight being at the York Hall in London on 22 February. Eubank stopped Alistair Warren (0–4–2), after Warren retired on his stool before round 4. Eubank next fought at the Copper Box Arena in London on 12 April against Hungarian boxer Sandor Micsko. Eubank landed a big uppercut in round 2, which dropped Micsko. The referee waved the fight off. In the post-fight, Eubank said, "I'm the next generation. I worked on the uppercut in the gym and I connected beautifully tonight. When I connect with these guys I'm taking them out, no one can stand up to my power and I'll only get better and stronger. I'm ready for a title fight now." 

On 10 May 2014, at the Olympia in Liverpool, Eubank dropped Polish boxer Robert Swierzbinkski (13–2, 3 KOs) seven times, eventually stopping him in round 7. Eubank was then added to a 7 June card, two days prior to it taking place at Metro Radio Arena in Newcastle. It was said that a win would move Eubank closer to a potential grudge match with Billy Joe Saunders, who was challenging for the vacant European title in July. Czech boxer Štěpán Horváth (12–3, 4 KOs) was his opponent. Eubank dropped Horváth four times, stopping him in round 6. This was Eubank's eighth straight stoppage win.

On the Saunders vs. Blandamura undercard on 26 July at the Phones 4u Arena in Manchester, Eubank stopped Croatian journeyman Ivan Jukic (19–2, 12 KOs) after just 2 minutes and 40 seconds of the opening round.

Eubank vs. Saunders
On 15 September 2014, Frank Warren announced that Eubank would challenge fellow unbeaten British rival Billy Joe Saunders for his British, Commonwealth and European titles on the undercard of Derek Chisora vs Tyson Fury II on 9 November at the ExCeL arena. The fight was not officially signed as Warren was waiting for Eubank to sign the contract. Warren gave Eubank until 5pm on 25 September. On 3 October the fight was confirmed, but would take place on 29 November instead and would also be a WBO final eliminator.

Eubank fought at the Echo Arena on 25 October in a scheduled 8 round fight. Eubank knocked out German boxer Omar Siala in round 2 after a right uppercut.

Eubank lost his unbeaten record when he lost a split decision to Saunders. The bout went the distance, with the experienced Saunders controlling the first six rounds with his footwork, elusive style and technical boxing ability, as Eubank was mostly inactive, with many speculating to him being over cautious due to nervousness and 'stage fright' as it was his first major title bout of his professional career. Regardless, from round seven onward Eubank took control with a much higher punch output, this resulted in the two young boxers brawling and trading hard shots for the rest of the fight. In the twelfth round, Eubank came out gunning for the knockout but was unable to get it. The early inactivity turned out to be the deciding factor as Saunders was victorious. One judge scored the bout 116–113 to Eubank, while the other two judges scored it 115–114 and 115–113 in favour of Saunders.

Eubank vs. Chudinov
On 30 December 2014, Frank Warren announced that Eubank would fight undefeated Russian boxer and WBA interim middleweight champion Dmitry Chudinov (14–0–2, 9 KOs), on 28 February 2015 at The O2 Arena in London on the undercard of Tyson Fury vs. Christian Hammer. Eubank scored a 12th-round TKO win over Chudinov and Eubank's efforts earned him the WBA interim middleweight title. At the time of stoppage, Eubank was ahead on all three judges scorecards 106–103, 108–101, 107–102. In round 2, an accidental clash of heads caused a cut above Chudinov's left eye. Eubank spent the rest of the fight landing power shot combinations and breaking Chudinov down. After the win, Eubank sought a rematch with Saunders, "This result is redemption and I'm back. And I want that rematch, Billy Joe Saunders. I'm coming for you." Ultimately however, despite given multiple chances Eubank refused to sign the fight which would have earned him close to £1million.

On 1 April 2015, it was announced that Eubank would finally meet rival Gary ‘Spike’ O’Sullivan in May at the Wembley Arena in London. The fight however did not take place.

After a 2015 that was mostly inactive, Eubank signed to promoter Eddie Hearn under the Matchroom Sport banner. Hearn is the son of Eubank Sr.'s former promoter Barry Hearn. Veteran trainer Adam Booth was added to the team to co-train Eubank.

His first fight following his signing with Matchroom was a bout against American Tony Jeter, making his debut on Sky Sports on 24 October. After knocking Jeter down in the first round, Eubank was able to knock him down twice in the second round before landing a flurry of combinations to Jeter, forcing the referee to stop the fight. Following the bout, Eubank was stripped of the interim WBA middleweight title due to his inactivity since winning it. Eubank then faced Gary "Spike" O'Sullivan in an eliminator to challenge the de jure WBA middleweight champion, Daniel Jacobs.

Eubank vs. O'Sullivan
Talks resurfaced about a potential fight with Irish boxer Gary O'Sullivan to take on 12 December 2015 at the O2 Arena in London on the undercard of Anthony Joshua vs. Dillian Whyte. The fight was well anticipated, as the pair had a history of feuds in the past, with O'Sullivan targeting Eubank on social media. The fight throughout had the pace set by Eubank Jr, however O'Sullivan showed great resilience to Eubank's continuous hard shots, particularly uppercuts. At the end of the 7th round, O'Sullivan's corner retired their fighter, who had sustained a perforated eardrum.

Immediately after Eubank defeated O'Sullivan, Hennessey Sports announced that they had won the purse bids and the rights to stage Eubank vs. Nick Blackwell for Blackwell's British middleweight title.

Eubank vs. Blackwell
In February 2016, Hennessy Sports announced the fight between Eubank and Blackwell (19-3-1, 8 KOs) would take place on 26 March at the Wembley's SSE Arena in London. The fight was shown live on Channel 5. Eubank dominated the fight to the point that his trainer, father Chris Eubank Sr., began imploring the referee to stop the fight. Following the eighth round, the elder Eubank instructed Eubank to stop hitting Blackwell in the head. The referee finally called a stop to the fight at 2:21 in the 10th round, and awarded Eubank the win, and the title, by TKO. Blackwell was taken to hospital with bleeding on the brain, and was placed in a medically induced coma for treatment. The fight averaged 1.5 million viewers on Channel 5.

Eubank vs. Doran
After re-signing with Matchroom Sport, it was announced on Sky Sports on 18 May 2016 that Eubank will fight on the undercard of Anthony Joshua vs. Dominic Breazeale at The O2 on 25 June. Tom Doran was announced as Eubank Jr's opponent on 19 May. Eubank had continued to climb up the ladder since joining Matchroom, having achieved a ranking of number two by the WBA and number three by the WBC. Eubank won via 4th-round TKO to retain the British Middleweight title. Doran was down once in the 3rd round and three times in the 4th as the referee waved off the fight. Eubank called out Gennady Golovkin in the post fight interview.

It was announced on 12 August, Eubank would make a mandatory defence of his British middleweight title against fellow British and undefeated Commonwealth and WBO Inter-Continental middleweight champion Tommy Langford after promoter Frank Warren won a purse bid to stage the fight. Eubank, however, relinquished the title in September after suffering an injury in sparring.

Throughout 2016, Eubank made it clear that he wanted to challenge undefeated unified middleweight champion Gennady Golvokin. A potential fight which could see Eubank earn up to £6 million, was only being held up by Sky, who would broadcast the fight on PPV. Eubank Sr. wanted his son to earn a bigger share, due to the risk of fighting a big puncher. By July, Golovkin had signed his end of the deal, only waiting on Eubank. On 8 July, Eddie Hearn offered the deal to then-IBF welterweight champion Kell Brook, who took the deal to fight Golovkin on 10 September. Eubank immediately hit out at critics stating he had never been presented with the fight contract. Boxers including Tommy Langford, Martin Murray, Curtis Stevens began calling out Eubank.

Super-middleweight

Eubank vs. Quinlan
On 13 December 2016, Eubank announced via his Facebook page that he would be making his debut in the super-middleweight division on ITV Box Office. The last time ITV showed live boxing was in July 2015, when Carl Frampton defended his IBF super-bantamweight title against Alejandro Gonzalez Jr. In the same post, stated he would be fighting 27 year old Australian boxer Renold Quinlan (11-1, 7 KOs) for his IBO super-middleweight title. Quinlan won the then-vacant IBO title defeating former world champion Daniel Geale in October via knockout in round two. The date of the fight was confirmed to be 4 February 2017 with the venue being at the Lee Valley VeloPark, Olympic Park, in London.

Following the announcement of the fight, jnr hit back at fans on social media who claimed the IBO belt isn't a 'real world title', "That title has been held by some of the greatest champions in recent boxing history and it’s currently held by Gennady Golovkin, at middleweight. You can’t tell me anything, it’s a legitimate world title." He also stated his move to super-middleweight was not permanent. He saw an opportunity to fight for a world title and took it. If he can win the world title, then he will negotiate with other champions.

Despite having not previously fought at super-middleweight, the December WBC ranking update had Eubank at number seven, previously being number two at middleweight. On 6 January 2017, Quinlan threatened to walk away from the fight. The reason being there was little to no promotion, with the fight being only weeks away. he stated the build up has not been enough to promote the biggest fight of his career, "It’s only a few weeks away and I've got the feeling that it’s going to be delayed. There’s been no media around it and it’s not getting the exposure it should be. I've been training well but I’m not 100 per cent focused now. I have a feeling it's going to get pulled."

On fight night, Eubank stopped Quinlan in round 10 in a fairly one-sided fight to win the IBO super-middleweight title. The fight was stopped by referee Howard John Foster, 2 minutes and 7 seconds of round 10 after seeing Quinlan backed up against the ropes being hit with continuous head shots. After a steady start, Eubank started taking control in the fifth round when he started using his speed advantage over Quinlan. After the fight was stopped, Eubank stood on the ropes in the corner in his trademark stance. In the post-fight interview, he gave credit to Quinlan, describing him as a tough fighter, "It was like hitting concrete. Big respect to Renold Quinlan. He flew halfway around the world to defend his title against one of the best in the world. He didn't have to do that." Eubank said that he was comfortable making 160 and 168 pounds and wanted to fight Golovkin, Saunders or DeGale next.

Eubank vs. Abraham
Reports suggested on 1 June 2017 that Eubank would make his ring return in July 2017 defending his IBO super middleweight title against former multiple weight world champion Arthur Abraham (46-5, 30 KOs) in London. It is believed that Eubank was offered in the region of £3 million. The two potential dates discussed were 15 and 22 July. At the time the fight was being discussed, Abraham was the mandatory challenger to the WBO title, held by Gilberto Ramirez, who defeated Abraham in April 2015. It would be regarded as Eubanks' biggest fight since his loss to Saunders in 2014. On 5 June, it was confirmed that the fight would take place at the Wembley Arena on 15 July and televised on ITV Box Office. The official press announcement was scheduled to take place on 7 June. At the weigh in, Abraham weighed 12st 1lb 5oz, which was 1lb 13oz over the limit. He was given two hours to lose the extra weight. Eubank weighed inside the limit at 11st 13lb 3oz. It was said that if Abraham couldn't make weight a second time, the fight would still take place in a non-title fight. Abraham made weight on the third attempt.

Eubank won via a unanimous decision with the scorecards 120–108, 120–108 and 118–110. Abraham had little to offer, mostly in defence mode as Eubank out landed and outpointed him. The last time Eubank went the 12 round distance was his split decision loss to Saunders in November 2014, and the last time he won a fight on points was on his 8th professional fight in December 2012. Eubank landed staggering uppercuts throughout the fight, many single and some in combinations, with Abraham only managing to connect a few shots clean, but left little to no damage.

Eubank spoke of Abraham's performance, "He's definitely the most durable opponent I've faced. I hit him with every shot in the book. He didn't win a round and I'm happy with the performance." With the win, Eubank advanced into the World Boxing Super Series, where he could potentially meet WBA 'super' champion George Groves in the semi-finals.

World Boxing Super Series

On 7 July 2017, the World Boxing Super Series announced the winner of Abraham and Eubank would be taking part in the super-middleweight knockout tournament.

Eubank vs. Yıldırım
At the Draft Gala in Monte Carlo on 8 July, Chris Eubank Sr., who represented both Abraham and Eubank picked undefeated Turkish contender Avni Yıldırım (16–0, 10 KOs). The fight was confirmed following Eubank's lop-sided win over Abraham. Promoter Kalle Sauerland said official confirmation of a venue and date would be announced in the coming weeks. On 8 August, it was announced that the fight would take place on 7 October at the Hanns-Martin-Schleyer-Halle in Stuttgart, Germany, marking it the second time Eubank would be fighting outside the UK since turning professional. 

Eubank used his hand speed and power shots to stop Yıldırım in round 3 of their fight to confirm his place in the semi finals of the tournament. Yıldırım was forced to take a knee in the opening round when Eubank landed a big uppercut. The fight came to an end after a flurry of shots, which were unanswered and the final punch was a left to the head which again dropped Yıldırım. Referee Leszek Jankowiak stopped the fight without counting, whilst Yıldırım attempted to get up. Some of the media and pundits felt the stoppage was premature and Yıldırım was recovering, however some felt as though he had taken too many blows to the head. At ringside after the fight, Eubank Jr told ITV, "I am here to dominate this tournament. I am sending a message out there that I am coming." Eubank landed 59 of 201 punches thrown (29%), whilst Yıldırım landed 23 of 91 thrown (25%). Before the fight, a big brawl broke out in the crowd.

Eubank vs. Groves
Due to winning their respective bouts in October 2017, Eubank and George Groves (27–3, 20 KOs) were due to meet in the semi final of the tournament. At first, promoter Kalle Sauerland stated he would try to book the fight for a stadium in either London or Manchester. In November 2017, ITV News reported the fight was set to take place on 17 February 2018 at the Manchester Arena in Manchester, Europe's largest purpose-built indoor arena. The winner of the fight would earn his place in the final of the tournament as well as walk out with the WBA (Super) and IBO super-middleweight titles. Tickets for the fight sold out in seven minutes. Groves weighed 167 pounds, a full pound under the weight limit and Eubank came in at 167.5 pounds.

Groves secured his place in the final of the tournament after defeating Eubank over 12 rounds. The judges scored the fight 117–112, 116–112 and 115–113 for Groves. Groves, the bigger man in the ring, used his jab to control the fight after a cagey round and mostly fought on the back foot, occasionally landing the big shot. An accidental clash of heads caused Eubank to receive a cut on the side of his right eye in round 3. The big cut was dealt with by his corner after the round, but as the fight went on to the later rounds, blood was seen flowing copiously. The fight was riddled with a lot of clinches and unclean punches from both boxers. Groves retained his WBA title but did not claim Eubank's IBO title as he did not pay their sanctioning fees. Groves also suffered a dislocated shoulder in round 12. It was said that Groves weighed around 184 pounds on fight night.

After the fight, Groves said, "It was about who wanted it most, I think, and I obviously wanted it most. The jab was landing correctly all night. When he had success, it was because I did something wrong. He was strong, he was aggressive, but that obviously wasn’t enough tonight." Eubank replied, "I thought it was close. I thought I did enough in the later rounds to win the fight, but it was a close fight. And all credit to George. You know, this is all part of boxing. You win some and you lose some. Hopefully we can get a rematch. It was enough of a good fight to have another one." Punch stats showed that Groves landed 117 of 398 punches thrown (29%) and Eubank landed 92 of his 421 thrown (22%). Many pundits and former boxers stated Eubank should move forward and hire a trainer. Both boxers earned a base purse of £1.5 million, which could increase due to sponsorship and PPV sales. Four days after the fight it was revealed that Groves did not fight for the IBO belt after failing to agree on sanctioning fees with the IBO's president Ed Levine.

Reserve fight 
On 9 May, Kalle Sauerland explained that Groves could potentially be replaced by Eubank Jr. in the final of the tournament against Smith, however there would be confirmation on the final in the next 10 days. Sauerland stated, "We're working at the moment on all the solutions and scenarios, where George [Groves] is fit and where he isn't. We’re hopeful [Groves will be fit], so we’ll see. You can’t start the tournament and then have the final lingering into the next tournament. I’m sorry, that’s not going to happen. We can push a month, but we can’t push it back by three or four months. We have a substitute system. We said that from day one, and that’s the situation. We want Groves in the final, but if that’s not possible and he doesn't declare himself fit in the next 10 days, we have to find a solution."

On 17 September, Sauerland announced that Eubank would fight Irish boxer JJ McDonagh (16–4, 8 KOs) on the George Groves vs Callum Smith undercard on 28 September at The Indoor Sports Hall at King Abdullah Sports City in Jeddah, Saudi Arabia. Eubank won the fight via corner retirement. McDonagh chose to stay on his stool after round 3, complaining of a shoulder injury. The crowd booed the stoppage after an entertaining round 3. McDonagh was knocked down in the opening round from a left hand to the head. In round 3, Eubank began to land a lot of shots on McDonagh. McDonagh was willing to stand and trade with Eubank. The high work rate from Eubank eventually backed McDonagh off. Eubank was not convinced McDonagh injured his shoulder and only took the fight on short notice for a payday. A fight nearly broke out when McDonagh heard Eubank's comments.

Eubank vs. DeGale 
On 3 January 2019, an official press conference took place to announce the James DeGale vs. Chris Eubank Jr. grudge match, which would take place on 23 February at The O2 Arena in London, exclusively on ITV Box Office, as part of ITV's new deal with Haymon Sports’ Premier Boxing Champions. The rivalry between DeGale (25-2-1, 15 KOs) and Eubank began a few years ago, after a series of run-ins, from sparring one another in the gym to trading verbal insults across social media. Serious talks around the fight first began in July 2018 after DeGale vacated his IBF super-middleweight title. The last time DeGale fought a fellow British boxer, was the majority decision loss to George Groves in May 2011. The fight was originally slated to take place in December 2018, however a deal had yet to be agreed. The possibility of the fight was first announced in November 2018 with PBC's plans to 'Invade UK Market', it was then stated a pay-per-view bout would be imminent. 

Eubank said he had been training in Las Vegas at the Mayweather Boxing Club alongside former boxer Nate Vasquez, who trains boxers and MMA fighters. Eubank said, "Instead of me going through the motions and trying to beat guys using heart and determination. Now we have strategy involved. This is going to take me to the next level." International Boxing Organization president Ed Levine confirmed their super-middleweight title would be at stake.

On 23 February, Chris Eubank Jr. defeated James DeGale by unanimous decision. The scorecards read 114–112, 115–112 and 117–109 for Eubank Jr. DeGale suffered knocked downs in round 2 and round 10 after Eubank Jr. barraged him with series of blows.

Return to middleweight

Eubank vs. Korobov 
On 7 December 2019, Eubank Jr., ranked #1 by the WBA faced former title contender Matt Korobov, ranked #3 by the WBA for the vacant WBA interim middleweight title. Korobov got off to a strong start. However, 20 seconds into the second round, Korobov injured his left shoulder. Shortly after, Korobov couldn't continue, and the referee awarded Eubank Jr. with a second-round TKO win.

Eubank vs. Morrison 
After a layoff of almost seventeen months, Eubank Jr. returned on 1 May 2021 to face Marcus Morrison at the AO Arena in Manchester, England, under the stewardship of former four-division world champion Roy Jones Jr. as his new trainer. Eubank Jr. was victorious via unanimous decision, with all three judges' scorecards reading 98–92 in his favour. Post-fight, Eubank Jr. reflected on the bout which had gone the full ten-round distance: "I had him [Morrison] hurt bad in the second round and probably could have ended the fight. But I wanted rounds. I wanted to use some of the stuff that Roy Jones has taught me. Experience the instructions he was giving me. If I see an opening, I usually take it. But I'm here to learn with a new coach. You can't get better by knocking a guy out in the second round. I decided to keep him in there. He's a tough kid."

Eubank vs. Awdijan 
On 16 October 2021, Eubank Jr. faced Wanik Awdijan at the Newcastle Arena. The former's shorts and ring-walk robe were adorned by the name of Sebastian, his brother who had died in July 2021. Eubank Jr. won the bout via fifth-round corner retirement.

Eubank vs. Williams 
In the biggest indoor arena boxing show in Cardiff, Wales in over 20 years, Eubank Jr. faced his Welsh rival, former world title contender Liam Williams, in a grudge match at the Motorpoint Arena Cardiff on 5 February 2022. Williams' home advantage ultimately did not pay off, as Eubank Jr. produced a dominant display to emerge as the winner via wide unanimous decision, with judges' scorecards of 116–109, 116–108 and 117–109. In the first round, Eubank Jr. sent his opponent to the canvas when he knocked Williams down with a jab. He scored another knockdown in the second round, this time knocking the Welshman down with a left hook. Williams was down yet again in the fourth round as a result of a slick Eubank Jr. combination. Although Williams improved in the middle rounds, Eubank Jr. scored a fourth knockdown in the eleventh round, before showboating in the twelfth and final round to cement what had been a dominant performance.

Speaking in his post-fight interview, a satisfied Eubank Jr. stated his happiness with his victory in spite of Williams' dirty tactics and pre-fight trash talk: "I am happy with the performance, I wanted to teach that man a lesson, he said some quite menacing things to me in the lead-up to this fight. I wanted to punish him. I didn't want to knock him out in one round, I wanted to punish him. Headbutts, headlocks, I am surprised he didn't get disqualified. But I took it like a man and I punished him like I said I would. It was a fun night."

Cancelled Benn fight 

In 2022, Eubank Jr. announced he would face Conor Benn at a catchweight of 157lbs. This fight has been marketed as a grudge match of sorts, considering the fathers of both boxers, Chris Eubank and Nigel Benn, maintained a fierce rivalry throughout the early-mid '90s, culminating in two fights: a TKO victory for Eubank during their first meeting in 1990, and a draw three years later in their second fight.

The fight was scheduled to take place on 8 October 2022 at London's O2 Arena. Eubank Jr. later admitted in an interview that he was struggling to reach the required 157lbs weight limit, which proved to be cause for worry with his father, who threatened to pull him out of the fight. Eubank Jr. has also stated that if he did lose the fight, he would retire.

On 5 October 2022, a statement was released from the British Boxing Board of Control declaring the fight was prohibited from taking place on after Benn tested positive for clomifene. Benn's promoters, Matchroom Sport, released a statement saying, "Benn has not been charged with any rule violation, he is not suspended, and he remains free to fight." Despite Eubanks' promoter also saying the fight will go ahead as scheduled, it was officially postponed.

Eubank vs. Smith 

Eubank Jr. fought former WBO light-middleweight champion Liam Smith at the AO Arena in Manchester, England on 21 January 2023. Eubank was beaten by TKO in the fourth round.

Professional boxing record

Pay-per-view bouts

References

External links

Chris Eubank Jr - Profile, News Archive & Current Rankings at Box.Live

1989 births
Living people
Black British sportsmen
British Boxing Board of Control champions
English male boxers
People from Hove
English people of Jamaican descent
People educated at Brighton College
People educated at Shoreham College
Middleweight boxers
Super-middleweight boxers
International Boxing Organization champions